James Saunders (8 January 1925 – 29 January 2004) was a prolific English playwright born in Islington, London. His early plays led to him being considered one of the leading British exponents of the Theatre of the Absurd.

Personal life
He was educated at Wembley County Grammar School, which now forms part of Alperton Community School and Southampton University. He married Audrey Cross.

Plays
His play Next Time I'll Sing To You, written in 1962, was staged in the West End starring Michael Caine, Barry Foster and Liz Fraser, at the New Arts and the Criterion Theatre in 1963. It gained him the 1963 Evening Standard award (with Charles Wood) for "Most Promising Playwright". The play was also produced in New York the same year.

In 1975 he completed John Vanbrugh's four-act fragment, A Journey to London, a play that had been sentimentalised by Colley Cibber in 1728 as The Provoked Husband. Saunders' version was first staged in Greenwich and successfully revived at the Orange Tree Theatre in 1986.

Bodies, commissioned and first staged by Sam Walters at the Orange Tree in 1977, was revived by Robin Lefévre at the Hampstead Theatre in February 1978, and given a West End transfer in April 1979, starring Dinsdale Landen, Gwen Watford, David Burke and Angela Down.

Television
Saunders' television work included Watch Me I'm a Bird (1964), and the BBC sitcom Bloomers (1979), starring Richard Beckinsale (in the year that he died) playing an unsuccessful actor working in a flower shop. Beckinsale's co-star was Anna Calder-Marshall.

Works
Stage plays include:
Moonshine (1955)
The Ark (1959)
A Slight Accident (one-act 1961)
Double Double (1962)
Next Time I'll Sing To You (1962)
Who was Hilary Maconochie? (one-act 1963)
A Scent of Flowers (1966)
The Travails of Sancho Panza (1969)
Games (one-act 1970)
After Liverpool (one-act 1970)
Hans Kolhaus (1972)
A Journey to London (co-author, 1975)
The Island (1976)
Bodies (1977)
Over the Wall (one-act 1977)
Random Moments in a May Garden (1980)
Retreat (1995)

Sources
Who's Who in the Theatre 14th Jubilee Edition, ed Freda Gaye, Pitman (1967) 
Who's Who in the Theatre 17th edition, ed Ian Herbert, Gale (Vols 1 and 2, 1981) 
Theatre Record and its annual Indexes
Halliwell's Television Companion by Leslie Halliwell and Philip Purser, Grafton Books (1986)

References

External links
 James Saunders – English playwright at www.jamessaunders.org
The James Saunders Papers at the Harry Ransom Center
 James Saunders' English bibliography
BBC Radio Plays by James Saunders
 

1925 births
2004 deaths
Alumni of the University of Southampton
Theatre of the Absurd
English male dramatists and playwrights
20th-century English dramatists and playwrights
20th-century English male writers